The Definitive Part One, released in 2008], is a compilation album by British heavy metal band Cloven Hoof. Apart from one new song, "Mutilator", all of the tracks are re-recorded versions of existing Cloven Hoof songs from the past.

The drums, bass, keyboard and rhythm guitar tracks were recorded live in the studio, with vocals and guitar solos being dubbed in for a cleaner finish. Guitarist/keyboardist Mick Powell was still a part of the band's lineup when this album was recorded, but had left by the time of release and is credited as a guest musician.

Track listing
Inquisitor - 5:22 (originally from Eye of the Sun)
Nova Battlestar - 6:02 (originally from Dominator)
The Gates of Gehenna - 4:48 (originally from The Opening Ritual)
Astral Rider - 5:36 (originally from  A Sultan's Ransom)
Kiss of Evil - 6:08 (originally from Eye of the Sun)
Mutilator - 5:01
Reach for the Sky - 5:41(originally from Fighting Back)
Road of Eagles - 6:21 (originally from 1982 Demo/Dominator)
Return of the Passover - 8:07 (originally from 1982 Demo/Cloven Hoof)
Laying Down the Law - 5:03 (originally from Cloven Hoof)
Mistress of the Forest - 6:51 (originally from  A Sultan's Ransom)

Personnel
Russ North - Lead and backing vocals
Ben Read- Guitar
Lee Payne - Bass, backing vocals, additional keyboards and guitars
Jon Brown - Drums

Guests
Mick Powell - Guitar and keyboards
Dale North - Narration vocals, Dale, aside from being the brother of Cloven Hoof's Russ North, is also a Singer/songwriter, Actor, Photographer, and author. His first feature-length film 'One Weekend', is due to be released in 2013 and co-stars Andrew Langtree from Coronation street and Emmerdale, the film was written, cast, produced, directed by, and starring Dale.

External links
 Cloven Hoof official site
 Cloven Hoof official download site

Cloven Hoof (band) albums
2008 compilation albums